Teddington Methodist Church and Community Centre  is  a Methodist church on Stanley Road, Teddington in the London Borough of Richmond upon Thames.

The first Teddington Methodist Church was situated in Clarence Road. Built in 1859, it was later known as Craig Hall and has been redeveloped as housing. A new building on the current site was opened in 1879. It was demolished by a Second World War bomb in 1944 and rebuilt in 1952.

The church's Minister is Rev David Innes. Services are held weekly on Sunday mornings and Sunday evenings. The church produces a newsletter, Focus, three times a year.

The church halls and worship area are used by many local groups for various community activities. "Teddington Voluntary Care" has its main office based in one of the rooms off the main hall.

Notes and references

External links
 Official website

1859 establishments in England
Methodist churches in the London Borough of Richmond upon Thames
Churches in Teddington